Richard David Pratt (born 1955) is a British Anglican priests who has been serving as the Archdeacon of West Cumberland (in the Church of England Diocese of Carlisle) since 2009.

Pratt was born in Cheltenham in 1955, and was educated at Ranelagh Grammar School and Lincoln College, Oxford. and  ordained in 1984. Following a curacy at All Hallows' Wellingborough he held incumbencies at St Mark's Kingsthorpe and St Benedict's Hunsbury before his appointment as the communications officer for the Diocese of Carlisle in 1997, a position he held until his archdeacon’s appointment. On 24 January 2022, Pratt started a job-share arrangement with Stewart Fyfe as Archdeacon of West Cumberland; on that date, he was legally ceased to be Archdeacon and became Associate Archdeacon. Pratt is also a bell ringer who serves as the President of the Carlisle Diocesan Guild of Church Bell Ringers (CDGCBR).

References

1955 births
People from Cheltenham
People educated at Ranelagh Grammar School
Alumni of Lincoln College, Oxford
Archdeacons of West Cumberland
Living people